The Women's short race at the 1999 IAAF World Cross Country Championships was held at the Barnett Demesne/Queen’s University Playing Fields in Belfast, Northern Ireland, United Kingdom, on March 28, 1999.  Reports of the event were given in The New York Times, in the Glasgow Herald, and for the IAAF.

Complete results for individuals, for teams, medallists, and the results of British athletes who took part were published.

Race results

Women's short race (4.236 km)

Individual

Teams

Note: Athletes in parentheses did not score for the team result

Participation
An unofficial count yields the participation of 109 athletes from 29 countries in the Women's short race.  This is in agreement with the official numbers as published.  The announced team from  did not show.

 (4)
 (1)
 (6)
 (6)
 (4)
 (6)
 (1)
 (6)
 (1)
 (4)
 (6)
 (1)
 (5)
 (1)
 (5)
 (1)
 (1)
 (6)
 (5)
 (4)
 (6)
 (1)
 (2)
 (3)
 (4)
 (6)
 (6)
 (1)
 (6)

See also
 1999 IAAF World Cross Country Championships – Senior men's race
 1999 IAAF World Cross Country Championships – Men's short race
 1999 IAAF World Cross Country Championships – Junior men's race
 1999 IAAF World Cross Country Championships – Senior women's race
 1999 IAAF World Cross Country Championships – Junior women's race

References

Women's short race at the IAAF World Cross Country Championships
IAAF World Cross Country Championships
1999 in women's athletics